The Committee for Military-Technical Assistance was an organisation set up in 1915 by the Tsarist authorities to ensure greater collaboration between industrial and technical experts and the Russian war effort.

Sections
The  Bureau for Organizing Morale was set up under the Menshevik Sergei Chakhotin. Its role was to produce propaganda for the war effort.

See also
War Industry Committees

References

Russian Empire